Bağdere is a village in the Adıyaman District, Adıyaman Province, Turkey. Its population is 573 (2021).

The hamlets of Gültepe, Güzelevler, Hatunçiftliği, İkidam and Uzunömer are attached to the village.

References

Villages in Adıyaman District

Kurdish settlements in Adıyaman Province